Lilliput Mountain is located on the border of Alberta and British Columbia. It was named in 1917 by the Interprovincial Boundary Survey.

See also
 List of peaks on the Alberta–British Columbia border
 Mountains of Alberta
 Mountains of British Columbia

References

Lilliput Mountain
Lilliput Mountain
Canadian Rockies